The 1990 Newham London Borough Council election to the Newham London Borough Council was held on 3 May 1990. The whole council was up for election. Turnout was 33.0%. Labour maintained its overwhelming majority.

Election result

|}

Background
A total of 154 candidates stood in the election for the 60 seats being contested across 24 wards. Candidates included a full slate from the Labour Party, whilst the Conservative Party ran 54 candidates. The Liberal Democrats ran 12 candidates as well as 3 candidates under the Liberal Democrat Focus Team banner. Other candidates running were 22 Greens and 3 Independents.

Results by ward

Beckton

Bemersyde

Canning Town & Grange

Castle

Central

Custom House & Silvertown

Forest Gate

Greatfield

Hudsons

Kensington

Little Ilford

Manor Park

Monega

New Town

Ordnance

Park

Plaistow

Plashet

St Stephens

South

Stratford

Upton

Wall End

West Ham

By-elections between 1990 and 1994

Bemersyde

The by-election was called following the resignation of Cllr. David Kellaway.

Forest Gate

The by-election was called following the disqualification of Cllr. Pamela Furness.

Central

The by-election was called following the resignation of Cllr. Pallavi B. Patel.

Little IIford

The by-election was called following the resignation of Cllrs. Patricia A. Heron & Bobby Thomas.

Greatfield

The by-election was called following the resignation of Cllr. Sean Cadogan.

Custom House & Silvertown

The by-election was called following the resignation of Cllr. Kevin Gillespie.

Park

The by-election was called following the resignation of Cllr. Dominic G. Gough.

References

1990
1990 London Borough council elections